Tibellus oblongus is a spider with a Holarctic distribution.

See also
 List of Philodromidae species

References

Philodromidae
Holarctic spiders
Spiders described in 1802